Anthanthrene is a polycyclic aromatic hydrocarbon. According to the International Agency for Research on Cancer,  there was "limited evidence in experimental animals" that it is a carcinogen.

References

Polycyclic aromatic hydrocarbons